UIG, Uig or uig is a placename meaning "bay" (from Norse) and may refer to:

Places
 Uig, Coll, a hamlet on the island of Coll, Argyll and Bute, Scotland
 Uig, Duirinish, a hamlet near Totaig, on the Isle of Skye, Highland Scotland
 Uig, Lewis, a civil parish on the western cost of the Isle of Lewis, Outer Hebrides, Scotland
 Uig, Snizort, a village and ferry port on the Trotternish peninsula, Isle of Skye, Highland Scotland
 Glenuig (Gleann Ùige), small village in Moidart, Lochaber, Highland

 Uigg, Prince Edward Island, a settlement in Maritime Canada

Other uses
 Uíge, a provincial capital city in northwestern Angola
 Uyghur language (ISO 639 code)